Peter McDowell is an American politician who represented the 4th Barnstable District in the Massachusetts House of Representatives from 1975 to 1979. He was a candidate for Lieutenant Governor of Massachusetts in 1978. He lost to William I. Cowin in the Republican primary. McDowell also held office in Dennis, Massachusetts. He served on the Planning Board and was Town Moderator and town Auditor.

References

1941 births
Kettering University alumni
Republican Party members of the Massachusetts House of Representatives
People from Dennis, Massachusetts
Living people
People from Hyannis, Massachusetts